Maatsuyker Island is an island located close to the south coast of Tasmania, Australia. The  island is part of the Maatsuyker Islands Group, and comprises part of the Southwest National Park and the Tasmanian Wilderness World Heritage Site.

The Maatsuyker Island Lighthouse, the southernmost Australian lighthouse, is located on the southern tip of the island. The island is part of the Maatsuyker Island Group Important Bird Area, identified as such by BirdLife International because of its importance as a breeding site for seabirds.

Maatsuyker Island is currently inhabited by volunteers, swapped out every 6 months, the improvements on it are being maintained by the Tasmanian Government and volunteer organisations interested in preserving the history of the island and the lighthouse.

Flora and fauna
The vegetation is dominated by the woody shrub Leptospermum scoparium, or tea tree, which covers most parts of the island, reaching a canopy height of 6 m in sheltered places.

Recorded breeding seabird and wader species are the little penguin (700 pairs), short-tailed shearwater (800,000 pairs), sooty shearwater, fairy prion (5000 pairs), common diving-petrel (10,000 pairs), soft-plumaged petrel, Pacific gull, silver gull and sooty oystercatcher. The swamp antechinus has been recorded.

The island is a haul-out site for the Australian fur seal and a breeding site for the New Zealand fur seal.  It is visited by southern elephant seals, which occasionally breed there. Reptiles recorded include the metallic skink, three-lined skink and Tasmanian tree skink.

Traffic
Access to the island has traditionally been by boat, but today helicopters have almost totally taken over this role.

Climate
Because the island is so far south and is influenced by circumpolar weather systems, average temperatures are significantly colder than most of Australia. Maatsuyker Island temperatures are around  all year with days being cooler and milder. Wind is usually constant.

Due to the high vegetation in patches on the top of the island, it is possible to shelter on the "jeep trail" that runs from the lighthouse to the landing. Several vehicles have been used here over the years, including Suzuki Sierras in the 1980s.

Weather observations have been recorded continuously from the island since 1891.

See also

 South East Cape
 South West Cape
 List of islands of Tasmania

References

Islands of Tasmania
Protected areas of Tasmania
South coast of Tasmania
Important Bird Areas of Tasmania
Seabird colonies
Maritime history of the Dutch East India Company
Penguin colonies